Arne Espeland (6 July 1885 – 22 April 1972) was a Norwegian writer.

He was born in Lista, and used local history as a theme for many of his books. Novels include Klar til batalje (1961) and Med livet i nevane (1964).

References

20th-century Norwegian novelists
People from Vest-Agder
1885 births
1972 deaths